Milan Mitrović (Serbian Cyrillic: Милан Митровић; born 2 July 1988) is a Serbian professional footballer who plays as a defender for Radnički Kragujevac in the Serbian Superliga.

Career
Born in Prokuplje, Mitrović started out at Zemun, making his Serbian SuperLiga debuts in the 2006–07 campaign, aged 18, as the club suffered relegation from the top flight. He spent a total of four seasons with the Gornjovarošani, before transferring to Rad in the summer of 2010. His official debut for the side came in a 0–3 away league loss to Partizan.

In the 2013 winter transfer window, Mitrović was sold to Turkish club Mersin İdmanyurdu, penning a three-and-a-half-year deal. He stayed there for the next four and a half years, collecting almost 150 appearances in all competitions (league and cup). In the summer of 2017, following the club's relegation to the third tier of Turkish football, Mitrović became a free agent.

On 29 August 2017, Mitrović signed a three-year contract with Partizan and was given the number 30 shirt.

Honours
Levadia Tallinn
Meistriliiga:2021
Estonian Supercup: 2022

Zemun
 Serbian League Belgrade: 2008–09
 Serbian Cup: Runner-up 2007–08

Partizan
 Serbian Cup: 2017–18

References

External links

 
 
 

Association football defenders
Expatriate footballers in Turkey
FK Partizan players
FK Rad players
FK Zemun players
Mersin İdman Yurdu footballers
Adana Demirspor footballers
People from Prokuplje
Serbian expatriate footballers
Serbian expatriate sportspeople in Turkey
Serbian First League players
Serbian footballers
Serbian SuperLiga players
Süper Lig players
TFF First League players
1988 births
Living people
Serbian expatriate sportspeople in Estonia
Expatriate footballers in Estonia
FCI Levadia Tallinn players
Meistriliiga players